The Willacoochee River is a  tributary of the Alapaha River in the U.S. state of Georgia. Via the Alapaha and Suwannee rivers, its waters flow to the Gulf of Mexico.

It flows south-southeast, eventually becoming the boundary between Berrien and Coffee counties, and later between Berrien and Atkinson counties. It joins the Alapaha River three miles west of the city of Willacoochee, Georgia.

See also
List of rivers of Georgia

References 

USGS Hydrologic Unit Map - State of Georgia (1974)

External links
 

Rivers of Georgia (U.S. state)
Rivers of Irwin County, Georgia
Rivers of Berrien County, Georgia
Rivers of Coffee County, Georgia
Rivers of Atkinson County, Georgia